Say Hi to the Band is the debut album of the Surrey-based alternative rock band Stagecoach.

Track listing

Personnel

 Luke Barham - rhythm guitar, lead vocals
 Nick Tanner - lead guitar
 John Harrington - bass guitar, backing vocals
 Tom 'Chop' Lewis - mandolin, synthesizer, backing vocals
 Matt Emery - drums, percussion, backing vocals

Singles

 "56k Dial-Up" 
 Released: April 2012 
 "Work! Work! Work!" 
 Released: March 2013 
 "Action" 
 Released: June 2013

References

External links
Official Website

2013 debut albums
Stagecoach (band) albums
Alcopop! Records albums